Rudolf I may refer to:

 Rudolf I (bishop of Würzburg) (died 908)
 Rudolph I of Burgundy (859–912)
 Rudolf I, Margrave of the Nordmark (d. 1124)
 Rudolph I, Count Palatine of Tübingen (1160–1219)
 Rudolph I, Bishop of Schwerin (died 1262)
 Rudolf I, Margrave of Baden-Baden (1230–1288)
 Rudolf I of Germany (1218–1291)
 Rudolf I, Duke of Bavaria (1274–1319)
 Rudolf I of Bohemia, ( – 1307)
 Rudolf I, Margrave of Hachberg-Sausenberg (died 1313)
 Rudolf I, Duke of Saxe-Wittenberg, ( – 1356)
 Rudolf II, Holy Roman Emperor (1552–1612), who was also Rudolf I of Hungary